A narrows is a fluvial landform.

Narrows may also refer to:

Places

Geographical features
 Narrows Creek, a stream in Sauk County, Wisconsin, US
 Narrows Inlet, British Columbia, Canada
 Narrows Pond, two small twin lakes in Winthrop, Maine, US

Settlements
 Narrows, Georgia, US
 Narrows, Oregon, US
 Narrows, Virginia, US
 Narrows Commercial Historic District
 Grand Rivers, Kentucky, US, possibly originally known as Narrows
 Narrows, a community in Leeds and the Thousand Islands, Ontario, Canada

Structures
 Narrows Bridge (disambiguation)
 Narrows Dam, north of Murfreesboro, Arkansas, US
 Narrows Dam, containing Badin Lake, North Carolina, US
 Narrows Dam and Power Plant Complex, a historic district
 Narrows High School, Narrows, Virginia
 Narrows Plantation House, Lake Arthur, Louisiana, US

Other uses
 Narrows (band), an American mathcore band

See also
 
 The Narrows (disambiguation)